Visa requirements for Afghan citizens are administrative entry restrictions by the authorities of other states placed on citizens of Afghanistan. In its second quarter 2022 report, the Henley Passport Index indicated that Afghan citizens have visa-free or visa-on-arrival access to 26 countries and territories, ranking the Afghan passport 112th and the least powerful passport in the world. Obtaining foreign visas from within Afghanistan is difficult as many embassies in Afghanistan have closed since Taliban takeover of the government in August 2021.

Visa requirements map

Visa requirements

Territories and disputed areas

Visa requirements for Afghan citizens for visits to various territories, disputed areas, and restricted zones:

Non-visa restrictions

See also

 Visa policy of Afghanistan
 Afghan passport

References and Notes
 References

 Notes

Afghanistan
Foreign relations of Afghanistan